The 1948 Miami Redskins football team was an American football team that represented Miami University in the Mid-American Conference (MAC) during the 1948 college football season. In its first and only season under head coach George Blackburn, Miami compiled a 7–1–1 record (4–0 against MAC opponents), won the MAC championship, and outscored all opponents by a combined total of 249 to 90.

Paul Shoults was the team captain.  The team's statistical leaders included Paul Shoults with 624 rushing yards, Mel Olix with 939 passing yards, and Hal Paul with 238 receiving yards.

Four Miami players received first-team honors on the 1948 All-Mid-American Conference football team selected by the Associated Press. They were backs Mel Olix and Paul Shoults, end Richard Urich, and tackle John Weaver. Four others received second-team honors: back Sam Wippel, end Harold Paul, and tackles Ernest Plant and William McCormick.

Schedule

References

Miami
Miami RedHawks football seasons
Mid-American Conference football champion seasons
Miami Redskins football